Daniel Scheinig (born 13 January 1988) is a German footballer who plays as a right-winger.

Having played as a youth for various clubs in Berlin, it was on the outskirts of the city where he made his breakthrough in senior football. He signed for SV Falkensee-Finkenkrug in 2007, helping them win the Verbandsliga Brandenburg in his first season. After an impressive 2010–11 season, in which he scored 19 goals in 27 games, he signed for SV Babelsberg of the 3. Liga, for whom he made his debut in August 2011, when he replaced Malick Bolivard in a 1–1 draw with Kickers Offenbach. After one year with the Potsdam club, and three appearances, he signed for 1. FC Neubrandenburg.

Notes

References

External links
 

1988 births
Living people
German footballers
Association football wingers
3. Liga players
SV Babelsberg 03 players
Footballers from Berlin
1. FC Neubrandenburg 04 players